This article describes all Stolpersteine that have been placed in Charleroi, Belgium. Stolpersteine is the German word for stumbling blocks placed all over Europe by German artist Gunter Demnig. They remember the fates of people who were murdered, deported, exiled or driven to suicide by the Nazis.

Generally, the stumbling blocks are placed in front of the building where the victims had their last self-chosen residence. In Wallonia, Stolpersteine are generally called pavés de mémoire (memorial cobblestones). In Dutch they are called Struikelstenen.

Jewish community of Charleroi 
Until the end of the 19th century, Charleroi had very few people of the Jewish faith. The Jewish community of Charleroi only developed in the aftermath of World War I. This community consisted mainly of poor families from Eastern Europe, who arrived in great despair and were desperately looking for work and survival. Charleroi was one of four Belgian cities that hosted sizeable groups of Jews, the others being Antwerp in Flanders, Liège in Wallonia and the capital Brussels. While the mines and industries were mainly looking for blue collar workers, the Jews tried to establish themselves mainly as craftsmen or with small businesses. Step by step, the Rue Chavannes became the focal point of a small Jewish Quarter, with small shops in Rue Neuve, Rue de la Régence and Boulevard Bertrand, with grocers, butchers, restaurant owners, hairdressers or shoemakers. In 1928, the existence of the Community Israelite of Charleroi was recognised through a Royal Decree.

However, in the 1930s the severe economic crisis endangered the Jewish community, and was followed by the rise of extremism. In 1933, Hitler captured power in Germany. In 1936, in Belgium, 21 right-wing members of parliament were elected. As World War II began in late 1939, Belgium was invaded on 10 May 1940. The country was forced to capitulate on the 28th of the same month. Thereafter Jews were confronted with several restrictions. On 29 August 1941, Jews were confined to four cities: Antwerp, Brussels, Liege, and Charleroi. In September 1942. Charleroi became victim of a raid and a convoy left for deportation. In summer 1942, Mechelen transit camp was set up and the Holocaust in Belgium started to take place with deportations from Mechelen to Auschwitz concentration camp. Altogether, 26 trains departed from Mechelen, bringing around 25,000 Jews and 350 Roma to extermination camps in the East, mostly to Auschwitz. Parallel to the deportations, opposition among the general population against the treatment of Jews in Belgium grew. Although the people did not have reliable information about the Holocaust, they sensed that something terrible was happening and started to hide Jewish men, women and children. By the end of the occupation, more than 40 percent of all Jews in Belgium were in hiding; many of them were helped by Gentiles, particularly Catholic priests and nuns, others by the organised resistance. The Comité de Défense des Juifs (CDJ, Jewish Defence Committee) provided food and refuge to Jews in hiding. In turn, many Jews joined the armed resistance. In April 1943, members of the CDJ attacked the 20th convoy to Auschwitz and rescued some of those being deported. Nevertheless, more than 24,000 Jews were killed before the camps were evacuated and/or liberated by the Allies, i.e. more than a third of all Jews living in Belgium in 1939.

In the aftermath of Nazi occupation and WWII, the Jewish community of Charleroi was severely weakened. Many were murdered, while some escaped and went into exile. Though most of those who had left Belgium never returned, a small Jewish community still exists today in Charleroi. In 1963, a new synagogue was inaugurated in Rue Pige-au-Croly, the only one in the province of Hainaut. The building also houses the Museum of the Memory of the Righteous among the Nations. The community is also involved in GRAIR, a group that furthers interreligious dialogue.

List of Stolpersteine

Dates of collocations 

The Stolpersteine of Charleroi were collocated by the artist himself on the following dates:
 23 June 2012: Abraham Kibel, Herszek Rojtman
 23 October 2013: Nuchem Bialek, Rosa Bialek, Feldon Izrael, Abraham Keusch
 29 October 2014: Frymeta Ginsberg, Michel Wislitski
 15 February 2015: Josek Machnowski
 10 February 2018: Oscar Petit, Eglantine Petit-Pierre

The initiative for the Stolpersteine came from the Association pour la Mémoire de la Shoah (Association for Remembering the Shoah, AMS), situated in Brussels.

See also 
 List of cities by country that have stolpersteine
 Stolpersteine in Belgium

References

External links

 stolpersteine.eu, Demnig's website
 Charleroi découverte: Le premier "pavé de mémoire" de Charleroi (French)

Charleroi
Charleroi